"" (lit. "Fedayeen warrior"), is the national anthem of Palestine.

History
The anthem was adopted by the Palestinian Liberation Organization in 1996, in accordance with Article 31 of the Palestinian Declaration of Independence from 1988. It replaced "Mawtini". It was written by Said Al Muzayin (a.k.a. Fata Al Thawra, "boy of the revolution"), while its music was composed by Egyptian maestro Ali Ismael. It was known as the "anthem of the Palestinian redemption".

Lyrics
The Palestinian fedayeen (from the Arabic , plural) are militants or guerrillas of a nationalist orientation from among the Palestinian people. Most Palestinians consider the fedayeen to be "freedom fighters".

See also
 Mawtini (Ibrahim Tuqan song), the national anthem of Iraq and former, unofficial national anthem of Palestine

Notes

References

External links
 MOFA Palestine
 Himnuszok - A vocal version of the Anthem, featured in "Himnuszok" website.
 Palestine: Fida'i - Audio of the national anthem of Palestine, with information and lyrics (archive link)

Asian anthems
Palestinian politics
National symbols of the State of Palestine
National anthems
National anthem compositions in F major